Temnothorax muellerianus is a species of ant in the genus Temnothorax.

References

External links

Hymenoptera of Europe
Myrmicinae
Insects described in 1922
Taxonomy articles created by Polbot
Taxobox binomials not recognized by IUCN